The National Health Service Executive (NHS Executive) was part of the British Department of Health established in 1996. It advised Ministers on the development of NHS policy and was responsible for the effective management of the NHS. The Executive ceased to exist on 1 April 2002 when 4 Regional Directorates of Health and Social Care were established and the central functions were reabsorbed into the Department of Health.  The Regional Directorates were abolished in 2003.

The functions of the NHS Executive were provided through the Headquarters (mainly in Leeds and London) and eight regional offices which replaced the former regional health authorities. The Information Management Group (IMG) was part of the NHS Executive made up jointly of civil servants and NHS staff. The IMG formed part of the Human and Corporate Resources Directorate, represented on the NHS Executive Board by Ken Jarrold. Their aim was to improve the ability of the NHS to harness and benefit from the management of information and the use of information technology. One of their key objectives was to promote and implement the NHS Executive's national Information Management and Technology (IM&T) Strategy. The IMG worked with other parts of the NHS Executive and the wider Department of Health to identify and secure the information technology implications of national policy initiatives.

Offices

Main offices
NHS Executive London HQ
NHS Executive, Department of Health, Richmond House, 79 Whitehall, London, SW1A 2NS
NHS Executive Leeds HQ
Medical Education Unit, Quarry House, Quarry Hill, Leeds, LS2 7UE, United Kingdom

Regional offices
NHS Executive Eastern
R & D Directorate, Capital Park, Fulbourn, Cambridge, CB1 5XB, United Kingdom
NHS Executive North West
930-932 Birchwood Boulevard, Millennium Park, Birchwood, Warrington, WA3 7QN, United Kingdom
NHS Executive Northern & Yorkshire Regional Office
R & D Directorate, John Snow House, Durham University Science Park, Durham, DH1 3YG, United Kingdom
NHS Executive South East
Research & Knowledge Management Directorate, 40 Eastbourne Terrace, London, W2 3QR, United Kingdom
NHS Executive South West
R & D Directorate, Westward House, Lime Kiln Close, Stoke Gifford, Bristol, BS34 8SR, United Kingdom
NHS Executive Trent
R & D Directorate, Fulwood House, Old Fulwood Road, Sheffield, S10 3TH, United Kingdom
NHS Executive West Midlands
R & D Directorate, Bartholomew House, 142 Hagley Road, Birmingham, West Midlands, B16 9PA, United Kingdom
NHS Executive Anglia & Oxford
6-12 Capital Drive, Linford Wood, Milton Keynes, MK14 6QP, United Kingdom

References

History and Background to the GHIFT Project. NHS Information Authority, CHIME, Royal Free & University College Medical School, 1999.
FAST (Foundation for Assistive Technology). 2005
List of NHS Executive Regional Office Primary Care Contacts. 2005
Informing Health Care. NHS Regional Librarians Group. 2004

Defunct National Health Service organisations
Defunct public bodies of the United Kingdom
1996 establishments in England